Felix Elvio Jiménez Rivera (born January 6, 1940) is a former professional baseball left fielder who appeared in one game for the New York Yankees in 1964.

Career
The ,  rookie was signed by the Yankees as an amateur free agent before the 1959 season.

Jiménez made his major league debut on October 4, 1964, and was in the starting lineup at home against the Cleveland Indians for the last game of the season. The Yankees lost the game 2–1 in 13 innings, but Jiménez went 2-for-6 with base hits against Luis Tiant and Tommy John. Jiménez, along with Clarence Dow and Tom Pratt, are the only players to have six at-bats in their only MLB game. He also recorded five putouts with no errors during the game.

Elvio's brother is former major league outfielder Manny Jiménez.  In retirement he has served as a scout in the Dominican Republic for the Los Angeles Dodgers and Boston Red Sox.

References

External links

1940 births
Living people
Amarillo Gold Sox players
Augusta Yankees players
Binghamton Triplets players
Boston Red Sox scouts
Bravos de Reynosa players
Columbus Confederate Yankees players
Columbus Jets players
Denver Bears players
Dominican Republic expatriate baseball players in Mexico
Dominican Republic expatriate baseball players in the United States
Indianapolis Indians players
Los Angeles Dodgers scouts
Major League Baseball left fielders
Major League Baseball players from the Dominican Republic
Milwaukee Brewers scouts
Mineros de Coahuila players
Modesto Reds players
New York Yankees players
Sportspeople from San Pedro de Macorís
Richmond Virginians (minor league) players
San Francisco Giants scouts
Saraperos de Saltillo players
St. Petersburg Saints players
Tigres de Aragua players
American expatriate baseball players in Venezuela
Tigres del Licey players
Toledo Mud Hens players
Dominican Republic expatriate baseball players in Venezuela